Kalegino (Kalegin) is a rural locality (a village) and the administrative centre of Kaleginsky Selsoviet, Kaltasinsky District, Bashkortostan, Russia. The population was 311 as of 2010. There are 2 streets.

Geography 
Kalegino is located 25 km northwest of Kaltasy (the district's administrative centre) by road. Chashkino is the nearest rural locality.

References 

Rural localities in Kaltasinsky District
Ufa Governorate